The  is an IAAF Gold Label international men's marathon race held in Fukuoka, Japan. It was previously known as the Fukuoka International Open Marathon Championship between 1947 and 2021, when it was announced the race would be discontinued on its 75th edition. However, due to popular support, a successor race, inheriting the tradition and course of the original marathon, was established the next year.

The course record is held by Tsegaye Kebede of Ethiopia, running 2:05:18 in 2009 to best his own record from the previous year. Toshihiko Seko (1978–80, '83) and Frank Shorter (1971–74) tie for most victories at the race with four each.

History

In its early years, the race had a rotating venue format, but these races are contained within the Fukuoka history as they all shared a common organiser and sponsor (the Asahi Shimbun, a Japanese national newspaper). The 1951 was the first of the race series to be held in Fukuoka. Foreign runners were invited for the first time in 1954 and Reinaldo Gorno of Argentina subsequently became the first non-Japanese winner. The competition was renamed as the  the following year and Finland's Veikko Karvonen became the first European victor. In 1956 the race reverted to a national race between Japanese men, but foreign runners were reintroduced for later editions.

The 1959 edition saw Fukuoka instated was the permanent host city for the marathon race and Japanese runner Kurao Hiroshima became the first two-time winner that year. Water stations for runners were introduced along the course for the first time in 1961. The last race to be held outside of Fukuoka came in 1963, when a special pre-Olympic edition was held in Tokyo as a way of testing the marathon course for the 1964 Tokyo Olympics. A year later, the course saw its first world record performance as Australian Derek Clayton knocked over two minutes off the previous record to win the race in 2:09:36.4 hours.

In 1980, Toshihiko Seko won in a time of 2:09:45 hours, just four seconds ahead of Takeshi So. This represented the first time that two men had completed the marathon distance under two hours and ten minutes at the same competition. The second world record of the competition's history came in 1981 and it was again an Australian runner, this time Robert de Castella, whose time of 2:08:18 hours became the new world standard.

In 2020, due to the coronavirus pandemic, organizers restricted the number of participants to about 100 runners.

On March 26, 2021, the Japan Association of Athletics Federations, newspaper Asahi Shimbun, and broadcast partners Kyushu Asahi Broadcasting and TV Asahi announced that the 75th Fukuoka International Marathon would be its last edition citing difficulties in continuing the event such as increasing operating costs and the COVID-19 pandemic.

However, on March 15, 2021, the JAAF and the Fukuoka Prefectural Government announced that a successor race would be held in December of that year "maintaining [the] history and tradition" of the original championship.

The Fukuoka Marathon is the third-longest running competition of its type in Japan, being established two years after the Lake Biwa Marathon and one year after the Kochi Marathon. This makes it the tenth longest running annual marathon race in recorded history. The competition has hosted the men's marathon championship race numerous times: it first held the event in 1955 and then hosted the race on a biennial basis from 1963 to 1997. It later hosted the national championship race once every three years, on a rotational basis alongside the Lake Biwa and Tokyo Marathons.

Qualification 
Male runners who achieved the following times in an official event of the International Association of Athletics Federation (IAAF) or a race for members of the Association of International Marathons and Distance Races (AIMS) in a certain period, and who were aged 19 years or older on the day of the race could apply for the race.

Group A:
Marathon: under 2 hours 27 minutes
30 km road race: under 1 hour 35 minutes
Half-marathon: under 1 hour 05 minutes

Group B:
Marathon: under 2 hours 35 minutes
30 km road race: under 1 hour 45 minutes
Half-marathon: under 1 hour 10 minutes

Winners 

Key: 
  Course record
  Japanese championship race

Notes

References

List of winners
Heyworth, Malcolm et al. (2010-12-05). Fukuoka Marathon. Association of Road Racing Statisticians. Retrieved on 2011-12-04.

External links
 Fukuoka-Marathon.com - Fukuoka International Open Marathon Championship (official site, English language portal)
 'A history of the Fukuoka International Marathon Championships' by K. Ken Nakamura (IAAF)
 Asahi.com - Fukuoka Marathon sponsor page
MarathonInfo profile
Inside the Outside - When the World Came to Fukuoka - Trailer 75 prominent marathoners from around the world reminisce about their Fukuoka Marathon experiences

Recurring sporting events established in 1947
Recurring sporting events disestablished in 2021
Marathons in Japan
Sports competitions in Fukuoka
Men's marathons
Annual sporting events in Japan
1947 establishments in Japan
2021 disestablishments in Japan